This is a list of symphonies in G minor written by notable composers.

See also
For symphonies in G major, see List of symphonies in G major. For symphonies in other keys, see List of symphonies by key.

References

G minor
 Symphonies